Allen Clarke (born 29 July 1967) is an Irish rugby union coach and former player. He is the current head coach of the Seattle Seawolves of Major League Rugby (MLR).

He is the former head coach of Welsh professional side the Ospreys in the Pro14, having previously been the team's forwards coach.

Playing career
During his playing career, Clarke was a hooker. Clarke spent the much of his professional playing career with his native province of Ulster and played in the 1999 Heineken Cup Final victory against Colomiers, the first ever European title for an Irish side. He also spent several seasons with Northampton Saints in England across two spells, having studied at the university in the town and later worked as a teacher there. Clarke was forced to retire due to injury in 2001.

Coaching
After his retirement from playing Clarke became a part of the Ulster coaching system, helping to establish the province's academy system. He was promoted to assistant coach under his former teammate Mark McCall, and served in this role during Ulster's 2005–06 Celtic League title-winning season. Following this success Clarke was hired by the IRFU as an Elite Player Development Manager, a newly created role with the directive of developing young Irish players. He also served as head coach of the Irish under-20 team and the Irish 'A' side during his time with the union.

Following five years in his role with the IRFU, Clarke returned to Ulster in 2012 as an assistant under Mark Anscombe. Clarke continued in this role under Anscombe's successors, Neil Doak and Les Kiss. During his second stint with Ulster Doak continued to be involved with the Irish set up on occasion, serving as head coach of Emerging Ireland during their successful 2015 Tbilisi Cup campaign.

Clarke left Ulster in 2017, joining the Ospreys as forwards coach under Steve Tandy. In January 2018, Tandy was sacked with Clarke named as his successor on an interim basis. Following a successful stint in the role, Clarke was offered the head coach position on a permanent basis, signing a three-year deal with the region in April 2018, but was terminated in November 2019 after a dire start to their 2019–20 season.

References

1967 births
Living people
Dungannon RFC players
Ulster Rugby non-playing staff
Ulster Rugby players
Northampton Saints players
Irish rugby union players
Ireland international rugby union players
Irish rugby union coaches
Ospreys (rugby union) coaches
Rugby union hookers